Cambon can refer to

Places
Cambon, a town and commune of the Tarn department of southern France.
Cambon-et-Salvergues, a commune in the Hérault department in southern France.
Cambon-lès-Lavaur is a village and commune in the Tarn département of France.

People
Pierre-Joseph Cambon (1756–1820), a French statesman.
Charles-Antoine Cambon (1802-1875), a French scenographer
Paul Cambon (1843–1924), a French diplomat and brother to Jules Martin Cambon
Jules Cambon (1845–1935), a French diplomat.
Carlos García Cambón (1949–) is a former Argentine footballer currently working as a manager. 
Edgardo Cambón,(1960–) the lead singer and conga drummer of Candela a San Francisco-based nine piece salsa music and Latin jazz band
Cédric Cambon (1986–), a French footballer who, as of 2007, is playing for Bulgarian side PFC Litex Lovech